Hans Gefors (born 8 December 1952 in Stockholm) is a Swedish composer. He has lived in Lund since the mid-1990s.

Selected works
 La boîte chinoise, for guitar (1975)
 Poeten och glasmästaren, chamber opera (1979, libretto: Lars Forssell after Baudelaire)
 Slits for orchestra (1981)
 Christina, opera in two acts (1982–86, libretto: Lars Forssell och Hans Gefors)
 Whales weep not!, a cappella chorus (1987, D. H. Lawrence)
 Twine (Music no 3) for orchestra (1988)
 En obol, song-cycle (1989, Lars Forssell)
 Der Park, opera in three acts (1986–91, libretto: Botho Strauss och Hans Gefors)
 Vargen kommer, opera in three acts (1994–96, libretto: Kerstin Perski
 Lydias sånger, song-cycle for mezzo-soprano and orchestra (1995-96 from the poem of Hjalmar Söderberg Den allvarsamma leken)
 Clara, opera in two acts (1997–98, libretto: Jean-Claude Carrière)
 Kabaretsånger (2001, Jonas Gardell)
 Njutningen (La Jouissance) (Music no 7), song-cycle in five parts (2002)
 Skuggspel, opera in one act (2003–04, libretto: Maria Sundqvist)
 Själens rening genom lek och skoj, car-radio opera (2005–09, libretto: Hans Gefors after Erlend Loe)    
 Umi sono mono for choir, electric guitar and percussion (2011, Yukio Mishima)
 Notorious, opera in five acts (2012–14, libretto: Kerstin Perski)
 Modstand mod renhed, three songs to poems by Inger Christensen (2015–16)
 Det store andletet, five songs to poems of Jon Fosse (2015–16)

References
Haglund, Rolf. "Gefors, Hans". Grove Music Online  (subscription required). ed. L. Macy. Retrieved on April 23, 2008.

1952 births
20th-century classical composers
21st-century classical composers
Living people
Litteris et Artibus recipients
Musicians from Stockholm
Swedish classical composers
Swedish male classical composers
20th-century Swedish musicians
21st-century Swedish musicians
Swedish opera composers
Male opera composers
20th-century Swedish male musicians
21st-century Swedish male musicians
Musikförläggarnas pris winners